is a private junior college in Tosu, Saga, Japan, established in 1952. The predecessor of the school was founded in 1878.

External links
 Official website 

Educational institutions established in 1878
Private universities and colleges in Japan
Japanese junior colleges
Universities and colleges in Saga Prefecture
1878 establishments in Japan